Colonel Sir Michael Robert Shaw-Stewart, 7th Baronet (26 November 1826 – 10 December 1903) was a British baronet and Conservative Party politician. He sat in the House of Commons from 1855 to 1865. He was the son of Sir Michael Shaw-Stewart, 6th Baronet.

A keen cricketer, Shaw-Stewart played a single first-class cricket match for the Marylebone Cricket Club in 1850. He was said to be a staunch supporter of the Renfrewshire fox hunt.

In May 1855, he was elected at an unopposed by-election as the Member of Parliament (MP) for Renfrewshire. He was re-elected in 1857 and 1859, and held the seat until his defeat at the 1865 general election.

Shaw-Stewart was Lord Lieutenant of Renfrewshire from 1869 to 1903 and Grand Master of the Grand Lodge of Scotland from 1873 to 1882. He bought the manor of Hindon, Wiltshire from his wife's mother and was appointed High Sheriff of Wiltshire for 1883.

On 28 December 1852, he married Lady Octavia Grosvenor, sixth daughter of the 2nd Marquess of Westminster. They had five sons and four daughters, including:

Sir Michael Hugh Shaw-Stewart, 8th Baronet (1854–1942)
Walter Richard Shaw-Stewart (1861–1934)
Helen Shaw-Stewart, married Charles Pierrepont, 4th Earl Manvers

See also
 Shaw Stewart baronets

References

External links 
 

1826 births
1903 deaths
Shaw-Stewart, Michael Robert
Lord-Lieutenants of Renfrewshire
High Sheriffs of Wiltshire
Members of the Parliament of the United Kingdom for Scottish constituencies
UK MPs 1852–1857
UK MPs 1857–1859
UK MPs 1859–1865
Scottish cricketers
Marylebone Cricket Club cricketers
Scottish Tory MPs (pre-1912)